In enzymology, a hydroxyethylthiazole kinase is an enzyme that catalyzes the chemical reaction

ATP + 4-methyl-5-(2-hydroxyethyl)thiazole  ADP + 4-methyl-5-(2-phosphonooxyethyl)thiazole

Thus, the two substrates of this enzyme are ATP and 4-methyl-5-(2-hydroxyethyl)thiazole, whereas its two products are ADP and 4-methyl-5-(2-phosphonooxyethyl)thiazole.

This enzyme belongs to the family of transferases, specifically those transferring phosphorus-containing groups (phosphotransferases) with an alcohol group as acceptor.  The systematic name of this enzyme class is ATP:4-methyl-5-(2-hydroxyethyl)thiazole 2-phosphotransferase. Other names in common use include hydroxyethylthiazole kinase (phosphorylating), and 4-methyl-5-(beta-hydroxyethyl)thiazole kinase.  This enzyme participates in thiamine metabolism. Thiamine pyrophosphate (TPP), a required cofactor for many enzymes in the cell, is synthesised de novo in Salmonella typhimurium.

In Saccharomyces cerevisiae, hydroxyethylthiazole kinase expression is regulated at the mRNA level by intracellular thiamin pyrophosphate.

Structural studies

References

Further reading

 

EC 2.7.1
Enzymes of known structure